The Nanmukan Tiruvantati is a Tamil Hindu work of literature composed by Tirumalisai Alvar, one of the twelve Alvars of Sri Vaishnavism. Composed of 100 verses in the form of a poetic device known as the antati, it is part of the compendium of hymns called the Naalayira Divya Prabandham, composed in the seventh century CE. It is dedicated to the preserver deity, Vishnu.

Scholars have posited that the primary purpose of the Nanmukan Tiruvantati was to establish the supremacy of Narayana (Vishnu) over Nanmukan (Brahma) and Shankaran (Shiva).

Hymns 

The first hymn of the Nanmukan Tiruvantati describes the poet-saint's assertion of Vishnu's supremacy:

The author also references Vishnu's incarnation of Narasimha and his slaying of Hiranyakashipu in this work:

See also 

 Mutal Tiruvantati
 Irantam Tiruvantati
 Munram Tiruvantati

References 

Naalayira Divya Prabandham

External links 
Nanmukan Tiruvantati text (Tamil)
Tamil Hindu literature
Vaishnava texts